Hartley may refer to:

Places

Australia 
Hartley, New South Wales
Hartley, South Australia
Electoral district of Hartley, a state electoral district

Canada 
Hartley Bay, British Columbia

United Kingdom 
Hartley, Cumbria
Hartley, Plymouth, Devon
Hartley Wespall, Hampshire
Hartley, Sevenoaks, Kent
Hartley, Tunbridge Wells, Kent
Hartley, Northumberland (Old Hartley), part of Seaton Sluice
New Hartley, Northumberland

United States 
Hartley, California
Hartley, Iowa
Hartley, Michigan
Hartley, South Dakota
Hartley, Texas
Hartley County, Texas
Brohard, West Virginia, also Hartley

Zimbabwe 
Chegutu, formerly Hartley

People
 Hartley (surname)
 Hartley Burr Alexander, (1873–1939), American philosopher
 Hartley Alleyne (born 1957), Barbadian cricketer
 Hartley Booth (born 1946), British politician
 Hartley Coleridge (1796–1849), English writer
 Hartley Craig (1917–2007), Australian cricketer
 Hartley Douglas Dent (1929–1993), Canadian politician
 Hartley Dewart (1861–1924), Canadian lawyer and politician
 Hartley T. Ferrar (1879–1932), Irish geologist
 Hartley Gladstone Hawkins (1877–1939), Australian pastoralist and politician
 Hartley Hansen (born 1942), Australian jurist
 Hartley Hartley-Smith (1852–1905), English cricketer
 Hartley Heard (born 1947), English cricketer
 Hartley Jackson (born 1980), Australian professional wrestler
 Hartley Joynt (1938–2021), Australian cricketer
 Hartley Lobban (1926–2004), Jamaican-born cricketer
 Hartley Peavey (born 1941), American businessman
 Hartley Power (1894–1966), American-born British actor
 Hartley Pullan (1899–1968), British World War I flying ace
 Hartley Rogers Jr. (1926–2015), American mathematician
 Hartley Sawyer (born 1985), American actor
 Hartley Shawcross (1902–2003), British barrister and politician
 Hartley Teakle (1901–1979), Australian conservationist
 Hartley Williams (1843–1929), Australian jurist
 Hartley Williams (priest) (1844–1927), Australian Anglican priest
 Hartley Withers (1867–1950), English journalist and editor of The Economist

Other uses 
Hartley (unit), a unit of information or entropy
Hartley College, Point Pedro, Sri Lanka
Hartley's, a UK jam and marmalade manufacturer
USS Hartley (DE-1029), a Dealey class Destroyer Escort in the US Navy from 1957 to 1972
 Hartley, a fictional town in Lancashire in the BBC series Juliet Bravo
 J. R. Hartley, a fictional character in a 1983 Yellow Pages advert

See also 
Comet Hartley (disambiguation)
Hartley House (disambiguation)
 Hartley Township (disambiguation)